Seán Cooney (born 1946 in Pullough, County Offaly, Ireland) is an Irish retired sportsperson.  He played Gaelic football with his local club Erin Rovers and was a member of the Offaly senior inter-county team from 1964 until 1975 winning two all-irelands and two all-stars.
He has also been a very successful coach guiding clubs to championship titles.

References

1946 births
Living people
Erin Rovers Gaelic footballers
Gaelic football coaches
Offaly inter-county Gaelic footballers
People from Tullamore, County Offaly